The Leckie Range is a group of peaks 50 miles south of Edward VIII Bay, Enderby Land, Antarctica. The individual peaks were first shown on a 1947 Norwegian whalers chart by H.E. Hansen. The range was named by ANCA for Squadron Leader Douglas Leckie, RAAF, who commanded the RAAF Antarctic Flight at Mawson Station, 1956, and who piloted the Auster aircraft from which Phillip Law sighted and plotted these peaks.

See also 

 Arnel Bluffs
 Leslie Peak
 Mount Allport
 Mount Cook

External links 

 Leckie Range on USGS website
 Leckie Range on AADC website
 Leckie Range on SCAR website
 Leckie Range satellite image
 Leckie Range area map

References

Mountains of Antarctica